John Franklin White (27 October 1873 – 22 June 1961) was a Conservative member of the House of Commons of Canada. He was born in London, Ontario and became an industrialist.

White was a manufacturer of iron and steel, managing the London Rolling Mill company at one time. He served as a city alderman for London City Council in 1913 and 1914, and for 1915 and 1916 was the city's controller.

He was first elected to Parliament at the London riding in the 1921 general election then re-elected in 1921, 1925, 1926 and 1930. In the 1935 election, White switched to the Reconstruction Party and was defeated at London by Frederick Cronyn Betts who became the Conservative party candidate in that vote.

References

External links
 

1873 births
1961 deaths
Conservative Party of Canada (1867–1942) MPs
London, Ontario city councillors
Members of the House of Commons of Canada from Ontario